{{Automatic taxobox
| fossil_range =  Pliocene - Present
| image = Crocuta crocuta sideview.jpg
| image_caption = Spotted hyena (Crocuta crocuta)
| taxon = Crocuta
| authority = Kaup, 1828
| type_species = Crocuta crocuta
| type_species_authority = Erxleben, 1777
| subdivision_ranks = Species
| subdivision =
Crocuta crocuta
†Crocuta dietrichi
†Crocuta eturono
†Crocuta honanensis
†Crocuta sivalensis
}}Crocuta is a genus of hyena containing the largest living member of the family, the spotted hyena (Crocuta crocuta). Several fossil species are known as well.

Taxonomy
It is still unclear whether the genus evolved in Africa or Asia, although the oldest known fossils are from Africa and dated to about 3.8 mya.

The Eurasian "cave hyenas" (Crocuta spelaea, Crocuta ultima and others) have been classified as distinct species, but are nowadays more commonly considered prehistoric subspecies of the spotted hyena.

Two extinct species are known to have coexisted with each other in eastern Africa during the Pliocene; Crocuta eturono and Crocuta dietrichi, each one probably occupying a different niche in regards to scavenging/hunting preference. In China there was a Pliocene species, Crocuta honanensis, while another species from the same period in India known as Crocuta sivalensis'' has an unclear status, being regarded as anything from a synonym of the spotted hyena to an ancestor.

References

Mammal genera
Mammal genera with one living species
Hyenas
Taxa named by Johann Jakob Kaup